The men's 73 kilograms competition at the 2022 World Weightlifting Championships was held on 9 December 2022.

Schedule

Medalists

Records

Results

References

External links
IWF Results

Men's 73 kg